Carlos Fernández may refer to:
Carlos Fernández (footballer, born 1984), Peruvian footballer
Carlos Fernández (footballer, born 1996), Spanish footballer
Carlos Fernández-Pello, Spanish engineer
Carlos Fernández Shaw (1865–1911), Spanish poet and playwright
Carlos Fernández (footballer, born 1990) (born 1990), Mexican footballer
Carlos Fernández Gondín (1938–2017), Cuban politician
Carlos Fernández Valdovinos (born 1965), president of the Central Bank of Paraguay
Carlos Fernández (wrestler) (born 1965), Spanish Olympic wrestler
 Carlos Graef Fernández (1911–1988), Mexican physicist and mathematician
Carlos Rafael Fernández (born 1954), former Minister of Economy of Argentina

See also 
Carlos Fernandes (disambiguation)
José Carlos Fernández (disambiguation)